Thomas Hamilton (22 March 1872 – 17 October 1942) was a Scottish footballer who played as a right half.

Career
Born in Dundee, Hamilton played club football for Kilmarnock, Hurlford United and Nottingham Forest, and made one appearance for Scotland in 1891.

References

1872 births
1942 deaths
Scottish footballers
Scotland international footballers
Kilmarnock F.C. players
Hurlford United F.C. players
Nottingham Forest F.C. players
Association football wing halves
Footballers from Dundee